The Battle of Montichiari (May 1373), is one of the most important episodes of the war waged by the papal league led by Gregory XI against the Visconti of Milan, preparing the return of the pope to Rome.

The aim of the pope was to reduce the power of the Ducate of Milan, traditional leaders of the Ghibellines, a constant threat on the territories of the Papal States.

Bibliography
 Arveno Sala, « La cospirazione antiviscontea in Bergamo del 1373 », Rivista del Centro Studia et Ricerche Archivio Bergamasco, 1983.
 B. Galland, « Le rôle du comte de Savoie dans la ligue de Grégoire XI contre les Visconti (1372-1375) », Mélanges de l'École française de Rome, Vol. 105, n° 105-2, 1993.
Jean-Pierre Saltarelli, La campagne d'Italie de Raymond de Turenne (1372-1373), Bulletin de la Société scientifique, historique et archéologique de la Corèze, T. 130, 2008.

1373 in Europe
1370s in the Holy Roman Empire
14th century in Italy
Montichiari
Montichiari